Ruaha National Park is a national park in Tanzania.

The park is a part of the  Rungwa-Kizigo-Muhesi ecosystem, which includes the Rungwa Game Reserve, the Kizigo and Muhesi Game Reserves, and the Mbomipa Wildlife Management Area.

The name of the park is derived from the Great Ruaha River, which flows along its southeastern margin and is the focus for game-viewing. The park can be reached by car on a dirt road from Iringa and there are two airstrips – Msembe airstrip at Msembe (park headquarters), and Jongomeru Airstrip, near the Jongomeru Ranger Post.

History and wildlife

Germany gazetted the Saba Game Reserve in 1910. British colonial authorities changed the name to the Rungwa Game Reserve in 1946. In 1964, the southern portion of the reserve was excised and elevated to full park status.

More than 571 species of birds have been identified in the park. Among the resident species are hornbills. Many migratory birds visit the park.

Other noted animals found in this park are East African cheetah, East African lion, African leopard, wild dog, spotted hyena, giraffe, hippopotamus, African buffalo, and sable antelope.

Since 2005, the protected area is considered a Lion Conservation Unit.

Issues
 The park was formerly known for its large elephant population. It had numbered 34,000 in the Ruaha-Rungwa ecosystem in 2009, before declining to only 15,836, plus or minus 4,759, in 2015.
 In February 2018, the carcasses of 6 lions and 74 vultures were found. They appear to have been poisoned.

References

External links

 Tanzania National Parks
 Friends of Ruaha Society

National parks of Tanzania
Great Ruaha River
Protected areas established in 1964
1964 establishments in Tanzania
Geography of Iringa Region
Southern Acacia-Commiphora bushlands and thickets
Tourist attractions in the Iringa Region
Important Bird Areas of Tanzania
Central Zambezian miombo woodlands